Gilbert Homestead is a historic home located at Duanesburg in Schenectady County, New York. The house was built about 1860 and is a rectangular two story, four bay frame vernacular farmhouse. It has a gable roof, a central chimney, novelty siding, and slender corner pilasters.  Also on the property are two contributing barns and two sheds.

The property was covered in a 1984 study of Duanesburg historical resources.
It was listed on the National Register of Historic Places in 1984.

References

Houses on the National Register of Historic Places in New York (state)
Houses in Schenectady County, New York
Houses completed in 1860
National Register of Historic Places in Schenectady County, New York